Sandrine André (born 22 February 1973 in Antwerp, Belgium) is a Flemish actress. The daughter of Dutch actor Bert André and Flemish actress Mieke Verheyden, she is married to the actor Hans Ligtvoet.

She became famous for her role in the Vtm-series Wittekerke where she played Merel and her role as Inge in the movies and series of Team Spirit. In 2007 she became popular for her role as Britt in Sara for which she was nominated in 2007 for a Vlaamse Televisiester as Best Actress for that role.

Filmography
Tabu (2010) as Barbara (Short film)
Team Spirit 2 (2003) as Inge
Oog in oog (1995) as Marie
De Dode (1979) 
De Herberg in het Misverstand (1976) as Jongetje

TV series
Zone Stad (2011) - Inez Vermeulen
Wolven (2010)
David - Lotte Naessens
Happy Together (2009) - Different characters
Aspe (2008) - Nadine Verschaert
Sara (2007–2008) - Britt Van Hove
It takes two (2007) - herself (winner)
F.C. De Kampioenen Season 17 episode 3 "Spaghetti Championaise" and episode 11 "Proost"  (2006) - Willeke
Team Spirit - de serie 2 (2005) - Inge
Rupel (2004) - Chantal
Witse (2004) - Tigla Fonteyne
Team Spirit - de serie (2003) - Inge
Recht op Recht (2001) - Sarah Aerts
Wittekerke (2000–2006) - Merel De Meester
Flikken (2000) - Caro
Heterdaad (1997) - Sarah Verhoeven
Wat nu weer (1995) as Kitty
Kats en Co (1994) as Monique Albers
Meester (1993)
Suite 215 (1991) as Lenie
Famillie as Veronique

Theatre play
Het opvoeden van Rita (2011) - Rita
Cyrano de Bergerac (2007) - Roxane

References

External links
Artist's website

Flemish stage actresses
Living people
Belgian people of Dutch descent
1973 births
Actors from Antwerp
Flemish film actresses
Flemish television actresses
21st-century Flemish actresses